is a Japanese footballer who plays for Montedio Yamagata.

Club statistics
Updated to 28 July 2022.

References

External links
Profile at Nagano Parceiro

1993 births
Living people
Osaka Gakuin University alumni
Association football people from Osaka Prefecture
Japanese footballers
J2 League players
J3 League players
Gainare Tottori players
AC Nagano Parceiro players
FC Ryukyu players
Matsumoto Yamaga FC players
Association football midfielders